The men's modern pentathlon at the 2008 Summer Olympics in Beijing was held on Thursday,  August 21. Three venues were used: Olympic Green Convention Center (shooting and fencing), Ying Tung Natatorium (swimming), and the Olympic Sports Center Stadium (horse-riding and running).

The Russians and Lithuanians continued to dominate the men's competition for the third consecutive time. Russia's Andrey Moiseev won the gold medal, and successfully defended his Olympic title, with score of 5,632 points. Moiseev also became the second modern pentathlete to win two individual gold medals since Lars Hall of Sweden in 1952 and in 1956. Meanwhile, Lithuania's Edvinas Krungolcas and Andrejus Zadneprovskis anchored the two-medal sweep in the podium, taking the silver and bronze, respectively.

Competition format
The modern pentathlon consisted of five events, with all five held in one day.

 Shooting: A 4.5 mm air pistol shooting (the athlete must hit 20 shots, one at each target). Score was based on the number of shots hitting at each target.
 Fencing: A round-robin, one-touch épée competition. Score was based on winning percentage.
 Swimming: A 200 m freestyle race. Score was based on time.
 Horse-riding: A show jumping competition. Score based on penalties for fallen bars, refusals, falls, and being over the time limit.
 Running: A 3 km run.  Starts are staggered (based on points from first four events), so that the first to cross the finish line wins.

Schedule
All times are China Standard Time (UTC+8)

Results

Gallery

References

External links
 NBC Olympics – Official Results & Schedule

Men's
Men's events at the 2008 Summer Olympics